Rudolf Dellinger (8 July 1857 – 24 September, 1910) was a German Bohemian composer and Kapellmeister. He almost exclusively composed operettas and was considered to be among the most outstanding composers of his time.

Born into a family of Bohemian of instrument makers in Graslitz, Dellinger received musical tuition early in life. He studied at the School of Music in Prague between 1874 and 1879, and later at the Prague Conservatory, where he was taught piano by, among others, Julius Pisarowitz.

After completing his musical education, he took a position as a clarinettist in Brno in 1880, then worked as a Kapellmeister in Passau, Eger, Prague and Salzburg. In 1883, Dellinger moved to Hamburg, where he worked at the Carl-Schultze-Theater. He wrote his first operettas there, which also premiered in Hamburg.

On 2 February 1886, Dellinger married Anna Maria Eppich, an Austrian singer.

In 1893, Dellinger was employed as Kapellmeister of the Residenztheater in Dresden, where he worked until his death at the age of 53.

Works 
Dellinger's oeuvre includes:
 1885: Don Cesar – libretto by Otto Walther, adapted from     Don César de Bazan by Philippe Dumanoir and Adolphe d'Ennery
 1886: Lorraine – libretto by Oscar Walther
 1889: Capitain Fracassa – libretto by F. Zell and Richard     Genée after Th. Gautier
 1891: Saint Cyr – libretto by Otto Walther after Alexandre     Dumas Sr
 1894: Die Chansonette – libretto by Victor Léon     and H. v. Waldberg
 1901: Jadwiga – libretto by Richard Pohl and P. Hirschberger,     after Les diamants de la couronne by E. Scribe
 1910: Der letzte Jonas (The last Jonas) – libretto by Richard Pohl and     L. Ascher

See also
 Dellinger (disambiguation)

References

External links
IMSLP
 Katalog der Deutschen Nationalbibliothek

1857 births
1910 deaths
People from Kraslice
People from the Kingdom of Bohemia
German Bohemian people
19th-century classical composers
20th-century classical composers
German male classical composers
German male conductors (music)
German opera composers
Male opera composers
German Romantic composers
20th-century German composers
19th-century German composers
20th-century German conductors (music)
20th-century German male musicians
19th-century German male musicians